The 2013 Boston Marathon was the 117th running of the annual marathon race in Boston, United States, which took place on April 15, 2013. Organized by the Boston Athletic Association (B.A.A.), it hosted the second of the World Marathon Majors to be held in 2013 with over 23,000 runners participating. Lelisa Desisa won the men's race with a time of 2:10:22, and Rita Jeptoo won the women's with a time of 2:26:25. Hiroyuki Yamamoto won the men's wheelchair race in 1:25:32 and Tatyana McFadden won the women's in 1:45:25.

The event was disrupted by a terrorist attack in which two consecutive explosions on the sidewalk, near the finish line, killed three spectators and injured 264 other people. The competition was suspended and many runners were unable to participate in the remainder of the competition. The attack received widespread international media attention.

Course

The Boston Marathon course has been the same since the inaugural race in 1897. The start is in the town of Hopkinton and the first  are downhill through Ashland and into the city of Framingham. Leaving Framingham, the runners enter the town of Natick, before passing through the 'Scream Tunnel' at mile 12. This area is filled with a 'tunnel' of young women from the nearby Wellesley College who request kisses from runners, a tradition that has been in place for more than 100 years. At mile 15, there is a large downhill section, followed by a  climb at mile 16 crossing the Yankee Division Highway. The runners take a right turn onto Commonwealth Avenue in Newton before starting the first of the four 'Newton Hills'.

At half a mile long and with a 3.3% percent incline, it is not especially difficult, but due to the hill being  into the race, it is still feared as the runners' legs are usually tired at this point. The course is mostly downhill to the end, and passes through Boston College before entering Cleveland Circle then Kenmore Square where there are many spectators. The final mile has a slight incline, before it flattens off to finish on Boylston Street.

Field
The fastest competitor in the women's race was Meseret Hailu who had run 2:21:09 to win the 2012 Amsterdam Marathon and 1:08:55 to win the 2012 IAAF World Half Marathon Championships. 2011 Frankfurt Marathon winner Mamitu Daska, runner-up at the 2012 Berlin Marathon Tirfi Tsegaye, and winner of the 2012 Chicago Marathon Rita Jeptoo were also racing. 2012 champion Sharon Cherop returned to defend her title. Reigning wheelchair champions Joshua Cassidy and Shirley Reilly returned to defend their titles in their respective categories.

Wesley Korir returned to defend his 2012 title in the men's race. He had most recently finished fifth in the 2012 Chicago Marathon. Also competing were 2013 Dubai Marathon winner Lelisa Desisa, 2012 Boston Marathon runner-up Levy Matebo Omari, 2011 Los Angeles Marathon winner Markos Geneti, 2011 New York City Marathon winner Gebre Gebremariam, and 2010 Boston Marathon winner Robert Kiprono Cheruiyot. In total, there were nine sub-2:07 runners in the field.

The wheelchair race began at 9:17 EDT (UTC-4), the women's at 9:32 EDT and the men's at 10:00 EDT. In the men's and women's races, the winner received $150,000, with second and third receiving $75,000 and $40,000, respectively.

Race summary
After 26 seconds of silence to honor the victims of the Sandy Hook Elementary School shooting, the marathon got underway with 53 wheelchair competitors leaving Hopkinton. This was the first time that Yamamoto, aged 46, had competed in the Boston Marathon. He beat South African Ernst Van Dyk by 39 seconds. In the women's wheelchair race, Tatyana McFadden, who was also competing in the race for the first time, won in a time of 1:45:25.

In the women's race, a small pack broke away from the main pack early on. All the runners but Yolanda Caballero dropped back to the main pack while Caballero continued on past half-way. She was eventually caught when Ana Dulce Félix increased the pace and broke away from the main pack to gain a lead of 76 seconds. Jeptoo managed to break away from the others after  when climbing an overpass to cross the Massachusetts Turnpike, and finished in a time of 2:26:25. She finished 33 seconds ahead of Hailu, who took second place. Cherop took third, 3 seconds behind Hailu and Flanagan finished fourth.

In the men's race, Jason Hartmann and Fernando Cabada led during the early miles before a group of nine caught up before half-way. The pack of eleven passed half-way in a slow time of 1:04:44, before Robin Watson, Geneti, Micah Kogo, and Dickson Chumba made surges. However, it was Chumba's surge that broke up the pack; only Desisa, Matebo Omari, Geneti, and 2009 winner Deriba Merga remained, with Gebremariam, Kogo, Raji Assefa, and Korir falling a few seconds behind. Desisa made a surge in the 24th mile to further reduce the pack to just himself, Kogo and Gebremariam (who had both caught back on). In the final mile, Desisa was able to pull away in a sprint to win in 2:10:22. Kogo finished five seconds back in 2:10:27 and Gebremariam finished a second behind Kogo in 2:10:28, with Hartmann taking fourth, as he did in 2012.

In total, 23,336 competitors, from all 50 states plus Washington D.C. and Puerto Rico, and from 92 countries, started the marathon.

Bombing

At 2:49 EDT, race clock time 4:09.43, almost two hours after the winners had completed, two explosions occurred near the finish line. Three spectators were killed and 264 others injured. Among the injured, 17 were reported in critical condition, with at least 14 people requiring amputations. The race was halted 8 minutes after the explosions; runners east of Massachusetts Avenue were diverted into Boston Common, while those west of it were diverted to Kenmore Square. Over 5,000 participants who were unable to finish due to the race being halted were given medals.

On May 16, the Boston Athletic Association (B.A.A.) gave participants who ran at least half the distance but were not able to complete the 2013 Marathon early entry into the 2014 race. The B.A.A. agreed to allow these 5,633 runners entry in August, compared to September for regular entrants. Qualifying standards were also waived for them. A memorial was erected in August 2019 on Boylston Street. It was built by sculptor Pablo Eduardo and consists of bronze spires surrounding two granite pillars.

Results
Source:

Wheelchair

References

2013
Boston
Boston Marathon
Marathon
Boston Marathon
Boston Marathon
Boston Marathon